Tomáš Šmíd and Miloslav Mečíř defeated Ken Flach and Robert Seguso in the final, 6–4, 7–5, 6–7, 6–3 to win the doubles tennis title at the 1987 Masters Grand Prix.

Stefan Edberg and Anders Järryd were the two-time defending champions, but were defeated in the semifinals by Šmíd and Mečíř.

Draw

Finals

Fifth place

Red group
Standings are determined by: 1. number of wins; 2. number of matches; 3. in two-players-ties, head-to-head records; 4. in three-players-ties, percentage of sets won, or of games won; 5. steering-committee decision.

Blue group
Standings are determined by: 1. number of wins; 2. number of matches; 3. in two-players-ties, head-to-head records; 4. in three-players-ties, percentage of sets won, or of games won; 5. steering-committee decision.

External links
Ken Flach Doubles-1987 from ATP
Peter Fleming Doubles-1987 from ATP
Sergio Casal Doubles-1987 from ATP
Stefan Edberg Doubles-1987 from ATP
Paul Annacone Doubles-1987 from ATP
Miloslav Mečíř Doubles-1987 from ATP

Doubles